Barkhang may refer to:

Derge Parkhang - a printing house in Derge, Sichuan in the historical Tibetan region of Kham
Barkhang Monastery - a fictional Tibetan monastery in the videogame Tomb Raider II